Mancor de la Vall is a small municipality in the district of Raiguer on Majorca, one of the Balearic Islands, Spain. It had a population of 1321 people by 2013.

References

Municipalities in Mallorca
Populated places in Mallorca